The Berryville Commercial Historic District encompasses the commercial heart of the city of Berryville, Arkansas.  Centered on the city's Public Square and radiating out along some of the flanking roads, the district encompasses commercial architecture spanning a century (1850–1950), as well as two municipal parks.  Most of the buildings are one and two story commercial buildings from either the late 19th or early 20th century.  The district, listed on the National Register of Historic Places in 2016, includes the previously listed Carroll County Courthouse, Eastern District and Berryville Post Office.

See also
 National Register of Historic Places listings in Carroll County, Arkansas

References

National Register of Historic Places in Carroll County, Arkansas
Historic districts on the National Register of Historic Places in Arkansas
Buildings and structures in Berryville, Arkansas